Kostyuk may refer to:

Denys Kostyuk, Ukrainian bicycle racer
Ihor Kostyuk, Ukrainian footballer
Marta Kostyuk, Ukrainian tennis player
Sergey Kostyuk, Ukrainian-born Kazakhstani footballer
Serhiy Kostyuk, Ukrainian footballer
Vasyl Kostyuk, Ukrainian footballer
Vladimir Kostyuk, Turkmenistani footballer
Yevhen Kostyuk, Ukrainian footballer

See also
 

Ukrainian-language surnames
Surnames of Ukrainian origin